Short Heath is the name of these places in England:

Short Heath, Derbyshire
Short Heath, Birmingham
Short Heath, Willenhall